DXAN-TV (channel 29) is a television station in Metro Davao, Philippines, serving as the Mindanao flagship of the One Sports network. It is owned by Nation Broadcasting Corporation; TV5 Network, Inc., which owns TV5 outlet DXET-TV (channel 2), operates the station under an airtime lease agreement. Both stations share studios and transmitters at TV5 Heights, Broadcast Ave., Shrine Hills, Brgy. Matina Crossing, Davao City.

References

See also
 One Sports
 List of One Sports stations

One Sports (TV channel) stations
Television stations in Davao City
Television channels and stations established in 2001